Isamaalit may refer to:
the Patriotic League, a political movement in Estonia in the mid-1930s
the Pro Patria Union, a modern-day political party in Estonia